Carrick Castle is a village on the western shore of Loch Goil, 7 km south of Lochgoilhead by a minor road along the loch shore, on the Cowal peninsula in Argyll and Bute, Scotland. It is within the Argyll Forest Park, and also within the Loch Lomond and The Trossachs National Park.

In 1877 a wooden pier was built at the castle, and a three-storey tenement building called Hillside Place was constructed inland from the castle, to provide apartments for visiting tourists. This was followed by several villas built along the shore road as accommodation for Glasgow merchants, developing what became a small village.

The village church is listed on the buildings at risk register of Scotland. There is a path to Ardentinny from Carrick Castle village.

Carrick Castle tower house

Carrick Castle, a 15th-century castle built on a rock on the shoreline of Loch Goil, was originally a Clan Lamont stronghold.

References

Villages in Cowal
Highlands and Islands of Scotland